Collector(s) may refer to:

Arts and entertainment
 Collector (2011 film), an Indian Malayalam film
 Collector (2016 film), a Russian film
 Collectors (film), a 2020 South Korean film
 Collectors (TV series), an Australian television series
 Collectors (Mass Effect), a fictional insectoid race in the video game Mass Effect 2
 Collector (character), a fictional character in the Marvel Comics universe
 "Collectors", a short story by Raymond Carver from his collection Will You Please Be Quiet, Please?
 The Collector (disambiguation), with several meanings
 Collector Records, an American folk label founded by Joe Glazer
 The Collectors (Canadian band), 1968-70 Vancouver-based rock band, forerunner of Chilliwack

Places
 Collector, New South Wales, a town in Australia
 Collector Parish, Argyle, New South Wales, Australia

Technology
 In automotive engineering, a part of some extractor manifolds
 In electronics, a part of a bipolar junction transistor
 In water treatment, a class of chemicals used in froth flotation
 A collector shoe on a bogie

Other uses
 A person whose hobby is collecting
 Collector road, a type of road leading from local roads to busier areas
 District collector or simply collector, in India, a government appointee in charge of a district in a state
 Collector, in finance, an employee of a collection agency
 A procurer of specimens for a scientific collection

See also
 The Collector (disambiguation)
 Collection (disambiguation)